This article provides details of international football games played by the Kuwait national football team from 2020 to present.

Results

2021

2022

2023

Forthcoming fixtures
The following match is scheduled:

Head to head records

References

Football in Kuwait
2020
2020s in Kuwaiti sport